Vejsil Varupa (born 25 January 1971) is a Bosnian former footballer.

A big talent, he played alongside future stars like Zlatko Zahović and Mario Stanić for Yugoslav representative teams, but his career ended at age 22 after he was seriously injured in a road accident where teammate Esad Zilkić died.

Personal life
He was the older brother of Elvedin Varupa.

References

1971 births
Living people
People from Vitez
Bosniaks of Bosnia and Herzegovina
Association football defenders
Yugoslav footballers
Yugoslavia under-21 international footballers
Bosnia and Herzegovina footballers
NK Vitez players
NK Varaždin players
FK Sarajevo players
Yugoslav First League players
Bosnia and Herzegovina expatriate footballers
Expatriate footballers in Croatia
Bosnia and Herzegovina expatriate sportspeople in Croatia